Platinum In da Ghetto is the fifth studio album by American rapper Lil' Keke from Houston, Texas. It was released on November 6, 2001 via Koch Records. It features guest appearances from 8Ball & MJG, Big Hawk, Billy Cook, Cl'che, C-Note, E.S.G., Lil C, Liz Leite, Slim Thug and Z-Ro. There is also a screwed & chopped version available.

Track listing

Chart positions

References

External links

 

2001 albums
Lil' Keke albums
E1 Music albums